Lamiako is a station on line 1 of the Bilbao metro. It is located in the neighborhood of Lamiako, in the municipality of Leioa. The station opened as part of the metro on 11 November 1995, replacing an older station.

History 
The station, then known as Lamiaco, first opened to the public in 1887 as part of the Bilbao-Las Arenas railway.

Starting in 1947, the narrow-gauge railway companies that operated within the Bilbao metropolitan area were merged to become Ferrocarriles y Transportes Suburbanos, shortened FTS and the first precedent of today's Bilbao metro. In 1977, the FTS network was transferred to the public company FEVE and in 1982 to the recently created Basque Railways. In the 1980s it was decided the station, just like most of the former railway line, would be integrated into line 1 of the metro. The old station building was demolished and new station opened as part of the metro network on 11 November 1995.

Station layout 

It is an at-grade, open-air station with two side platforms.

Access 

   1, Langileria street
  1, Gabriel Aresti street
   Station's interior

Services 
The station is served by line 1 from Etxebarri to Plentzia. The station is also served by local Leioabus and regional Bizkaibus bus services.

Gallery

References

External links
 

Line 1 (Bilbao metro) stations
Railway stations in Spain opened in 1887
Railway stations in Spain opened in 1995
1995 establishments in the Basque Country (autonomous community)